Anssi Valtteri Jaakkola (born 13 March 1987) is a Finnish professional footballer who plays as a goalkeeper for EFL League One club Bristol Rovers and the Finland national team. Jaakkola was born in Kemi. He began his senior club career playing for TP-47 at age of 17 in 2004, before signing with Serie A side Siena in 2007.

Jaakkola made his international debut for Finland in June 2011, at the age of 24. He was nominated for all 10 of Finland's UEFA Euro 2020 qualification matches but did not gain any appearances when Finland national team secured its first ever place in European Football Championship tournament's group stage.

Club career

Early career

Jaakkola previously played for TP-47 and FC-88. In the January 2007 window, Jaakkola signed a three-and-a-half-year contract with Serie A side Siena. He made his Serie A debut by substituting Dimitrios Eleftheropoulos in the 2007–08 season final matchday, a 2–2 home draw with Palermo. In 2009, he was loaned to V.F. Colligiana in Lega Pro Seconda Divisione. He moved to Slavia Prague on free transfer in July 2010, signing a two-year contract with the option of a further year.

Kilmarnock
In January 2011, Jaakkola left Slavia for Scottish Premier League club Kilmarnock, under the management of fellow Finn Mixu Paatelainen. He made his debut as a substitute on 12 February against Hibernian. He then made his first start on 26 February against St Mirren. He left Kilmarnock when his contract expired in the summer of 2013.

Ajax Cape Town
Jaakkola joined South African Premier Soccer League club Ajax Cape Town in August 2013. On 22 September 2013 Jaakkola made his debut in the Premier Soccer League in a match against Polokwane when he came in as a substitute for Brandon Peterson on 57th minute of the match.

Reading
On 11 July 2016, Jaakkola signed a two-year contract with Reading. Jaakkola made his competitive debut for Reading on 8 August 2016, playing the full 90 minutes of Reading's 2–0 EFL Cup victory over Plymouth Argyle. 
On 7 November 2018 he was awarded as Reading supporters October player of the month. He was released by Reading at the end of the 2018–19 season.

Bristol Rovers 
After his contract at Reading expired, Jaakkola joined League One side Bristol Rovers. Jaakola made over twenty appearances in his debut season for Rovers before his season was cut short by an injury on New Years Day against Milton Keynes Dons. After the season was cut short, Jaakola signed a new contract on 3 July 2020 until the end of the 2021-22 season with an option for a further year. On 8 December 2020, Jaakkola was taken off with an Achilles injury in an EFL Trophy match against Leyton Orient and was originally set to be out of contention for a few weeks, but he was still yet to return in February 2021 when new manager Joey Barton gave an update stating that Jaakkola was 'about a week away' from being able to return to action. He made his return on 27 March 2021 in a 1–0 home defeat to Sunderland as Rovers continued to fight against relegation.

Jaakkola featured in the first two League Two matches of the 2021–22 season before the return of his recurring Achilles injury forced him out of action. In early September, manager Barton estimated that he would be injured for another week, however Jaakkola needed injections in the Achilles and in October it was estimated that he would be out of action until November in order to allow the injury to fully heal with the hope to solve the problem for good. With James Belshaw having impressed in Jaakkola's absence, upon his return from injury Jaakkola found himself on the bench before a slight knock to Belshaw at the end of January allowed Jaakkola the opportunity to return to first-team football. Following Rovers' promotion back to League One at the end of the 2021–22 season, Jaakkola stepped up into the role of goalkeeping coach in pre-season following the departure of goalkeeping coach Tony Warner to Jaakkola's former club Reading.

International career
On 30 August 2010 he was selected to represent Finland for European Championship qualification matches against Moldova and Netherlands as a replacement for injured Peter Enckelman. However, he didn't earn any caps. He made his national team debut on 7 June 2011, conceding five goals against Sweden in a 5–0 away loss. He gained his second appearance in the national team on 7 June 2017 when Markku Kanerva announced that Jaakkola would replace Lukáš Hrádecký in a friendly match against Liechtenstein.  

In May 2021, Jaakkola was named in the provisional-26 man squad for the upcoming delayed UEFA Euro 2020 Championship. Jaakkola was a member of the Finnish squad at the UEFA Euro 2020 tournament but remained as an unused substitute for Lukáš Hrádecký. Finland was placed 3rd in Group B following a 2-0 defeat to Belgium on 21 June 2021.

Career statistics

Club

International

Honours

Club
Kilmarnock
 Scottish League Cup: 2011–12

Ajax Cape Town
 MTN 8: 2015

Bristol Rovers
EFL League Two third-place promotion: 2021–22

Personal life
Jaakkola has two daughters and one son. His wife is Scottish.

References

External links

 Bristol Rovers official profile
 Anssi Jaakkola – SPL competition record 
 
 
 
 
Career profile (from La Gazzetta dello Sport)  

1987 births
Living people
People from Kemi
Association football goalkeepers
Finnish footballers
Finland under-21 international footballers
Finland international footballers
TP-47 players
A.C.N. Siena 1904 players
A.S.D. Olimpia Colligiana players
SK Slavia Prague players
Kilmarnock F.C. players
Cape Town Spurs F.C. players
Reading F.C. players
Bristol Rovers F.C. players
Veikkausliiga players
Ykkönen players
Serie A players
Czech First League players
Scottish Premier League players
South African Premier Division players
English Football League players
UEFA Euro 2020 players
Finnish expatriate footballers
Expatriate footballers in Italy
Finnish expatriate sportspeople in Italy
Expatriate footballers in the Czech Republic
Finnish expatriate sportspeople in the Czech Republic
Expatriate footballers in Scotland
Finnish expatriate sportspeople in Scotland
Expatriate soccer players in South Africa
Finnish expatriate sportspeople in South Africa
Expatriate footballers in England
Finnish expatriate sportspeople in England
Sportspeople from Lapland (Finland)